Wutai may refer to:

Locations in mainland China or Taiwan 
 Wutai County (五台县), of Xinzhou, Shanxi
 Mount Wutai (五台山), mountain sacred to Buddhism in Shanxi
 Wutai, Dancheng County (吴台镇), town in Dancheng County, Henan
 Wutai, Pingyi County (武台镇), town in Pingyi County, Shandong
 Wutai, Zibo (梧台镇), town in Linzi District, Zibo, Shandong
 Wutai, Pingtung (霧臺鄉), township in Pingtung County, Taiwan

Other 
 Wutai (Final Fantasy), fictional location in the game Final Fantasy VII